Borko Veselinović (born 6 January 1986) is a Serbian professional footballer who plays as a forward.

Club career
Veselinović progressed through the youth system of Partizan as one of the club's most promising prospects, breaking into the first-team squad under manager Lothar Matthäus in the second half of the 2002–03 season. He was later assigned to their affiliated club Teleoptik on dual registration, racking up an impressive goals-to-games ratio in the Serbian League Belgrade. In early 2005, Veselinović was loaned to Obilić until the end of the season. He scored five goals in 11 league appearances and helped the side narrowly avoid relegation from the top flight. After returning to Partizan in the 2005–06 season, Veselinović again struggled to receive more playing time, but continued to score regularly for Teleoptik in the Serbian League Belgrade. He later also went on loan to Bežanija and Beira-Mar.

In early 2008, Veselinović was transferred to K League side Incheon United. He spent two seasons with the team before moving to Chinese Super League club Dalian Shide in 2010.

After spending over a year without competitive football, Veselinović signed with Serbian SuperLiga side Spartak Subotica in June 2012.

International career
Veselinović represented FR Yugoslavia at the 2002 UEFA European Under-17 Championship, as the team were eliminated in the quarter-finals by England. He was also a member of the Serbia and Montenegro squad at the 2005 UEFA European Under-19 Championship, as they lost in the semi-finals to England. Veselinović was the tournament's top scorer with five goals.

Veselinović played for the Serbia national under-21 team in their opener of the 2009 UEFA European Under-21 Championship qualification, coming on as a substitute in a 1–1 home draw with Latvia.

Notes

References

External links
 
 
 
 
 

Association football forwards
Chinese Super League players
Dalian Shide F.C. players
Expatriate footballers in China
Expatriate footballers in Portugal
Expatriate footballers in South Korea
First League of Serbia and Montenegro players
FK Bežanija players
FK Javor Ivanjica players
FK Obilić players
FK Partizan players
FK Rad players
FK Spartak Subotica players
FK Teleoptik players
FK Zlatibor Čajetina players
Incheon United FC players
K League 1 players
Kosovo Serbs
Primeira Liga players
S.C. Beira-Mar players
FK Sinđelić Beograd players
Serbia and Montenegro footballers
Serbia under-21 international footballers
Serbian expatriate footballers
Serbian expatriate sportspeople in China
Serbian expatriate sportspeople in Portugal
Serbian expatriate sportspeople in South Korea
Serbian footballers
Serbian SuperLiga players
Serbian First League players
Sportspeople from Pristina
1986 births
Living people